Gastrodia javanica, or Javanese chijian (Japanese: 爪哇赤箭), is an epiparasitic species of orchid native to Singapore, the Philippines, Indonesia, Malaysia, and Thailand.  The species normally grows to a height of 20 to 80 centimeters, and has pale yellow or green-yellow flowers.

References

Parasitic plants
Orchids of Indonesia
Orchids of Malaysia
Orchids of Thailand
Orchids of the Philippines
Plants described in 1840
Taxa named by Carl Ludwig Blume
javanica